Angoda is a village in Colombo District,  Western Province, Sri Lanka. It is famous for the National Institute of Mental Health.

See also
List of towns in Western Province, Sri Lanka

External links

References

Towns in Western Province, Sri Lanka